Andrzej Piotr Grabowski (born 15 March 1952 in Chrzanów, Poland) is a Polish actor, singer and comedian. He is best known for playing the role of Ferdynand Kiepski in the TV series Świat według Kiepskich.

Career 
Grabowski graduated from Ludwik Solski Academy for the Dramatic Arts in Krakow in 1974, and shortly afterwards started to perform at Juliusz Słowacki Theatre. Two years later he starred in the play  Przepraszam, czy tu biją. During his studies in Krakow , Grabowski debuted in the full-length movie, Odejścia, powroty. He played only supporting roles in films until 1989, when he played one of the main characters in the movie Kapitał, czyli jak zrobić pieniądze w Polsce.

Grabowski gained widespread popularity in 1999 when he started to play the main character Ferdynand Kiepski in the TV series Świat według Kiepskich. The show is still on air.

Grabowski's other notable appearances include  the music video for "Pokaż mi niebo," a song by Polish band Feel, and the third season of Polish version of the French game show Fort Boyard. He is also known for his Polish dubbing for characters in movies such as Toy Story 3 and Chicken Little.

Grabowski was awarded the Medal for Merit to Culture – Gloria Artis in 2007 for outstanding contribution to Polish culture.

Personal life 
Grabowski was married to actress Anna Tomaszewska; the pair divorced in 2008. The marriage produced two daughters: Zuzanna and Katarzyna. Grabowski's son-in-law (and Zuzanna's husband) is Paweł Domagała.

On 12 June 2009 Grabowski married Anita Kruszewska, a make-up artist with which he divorced in February 2018. From 2020 he is in a relationship with actress Aldona Grochal.

His best man was the Polish actor Jan Nowicki.

Filmography 
The Plagues of Breslau (2018) .... public prosecutor
Spoor (2017) .... director
Demon (2015) .... Zaneta's father
Secret Wars (2014) .... Prior
Operation H2O (2012) .... Radek Szczemborski
Skrzydlate świnie (2010) .... Edzio
Milion dolarów (2010) .... Tomuś
Piksele (2010) .... Grave-digger
Lunatycy (2009) (TV) .... Wacław - Kama's father
Tajemnica Westerplatte (2009) .... Adolf Petzelt
Od pełni do pełni (2009) .... Kaminski
Little Moscow (2008)
Senność (2008) .... Father
Mr. Kuka's Advice (2008) .... Kuka
Jak żyć? (2008) .... Prisoner
The Chauffeur (2008) .... Modrak
Świadek koronny (2007) .... Jaroslaw Kowalik 'Kowal'
Strike (2006) .... Sobieski
Dublerzy (2006) .... Leon May
We're All Christs (2006) .... Adas' Drinking Friend
Diabeł (2005) .... Franciszek
Pitbull (2005) .... Jacek Goc "Gebels"
Atrakcyjny pozna panią (2004) .... Wacław
Zróbmy sobie wnuka (2003) .... Maniek Kosela
Superprodukcja (2003) .... Napoleon
Jak to się robi z dziewczynami (2002) .... Zenon
Golden Tears (2002)
E=mc2 (2002) .... Zając
Day of the Wacko (2002) .... Neighbour
Kariera Nikosia Dyzmy (2002) .... Roman Kiliński
Edges of the Lord (2001) .... Kluba
Klinika pod wyrwigroszem (2001) (TV mini-series) .... Man
The Tale of Mrs. Doughnut (2000) .... Palacz
Liceum czarnej magii (2000) (TV) .... Tomasz Jarski
With Fire and Sword (1999) (as A. Grabowski) .... Drunk Nobleman
Odwrócona góra albo film pod strasznym tytułem (1999)
Prostytutki (1998) .... Ula's Father
Love Me and Do Whatever You Want (1998) .... Sergeant looking for Sławek
Sława i chwała (1998) (TV mini-series) .... Golicz
La ballata dei lavavetri (1998) .... Paweł
Colonel Kwiatkowski (1995) .... Priest
Polska śmierć (1995) .... Sergeant
Cudowne miejsce (1994) .... Moon
Śmierć jak kromka chleba (1994) .... Miner
Kapitał, czyli jak zrobić pieniądze w Polsce (1990) .... Stefan Sapieja
Dulscy (1976) .... Office worker

TV series 
Świat według Kiepskich (1999—now) .... Ferdynand Kiepski
Blondynka (2010-now) .... Traczyk
Duch w dom (2010) .... Kazimierz
Nowa .... Janusz Sochon (1 episode, 2010)
Naznaczony .... Puchalik (2 episodes, 2009)
Ojciec Mateusz .... Coach Sylwester (1 episode, 2009)
Tylko miłość .... Max Wolar (26 episodes, 2007–2009)
Pitbull .... Jacek Goc 'Gebels' (31 episodes, 2005–2008)
Odwróceni .... Jaroslaw 'Kowal' Kowalik (11 episodes, 2007)
Ja wam pokażę! (2007) .... Homeless man
Hela w opałach .... Policeman (1 episode, 2006)
Złotopolscy .... Andrzej Złotopolski (2004–2006)
The Nanny .... Lucjan Furman (1 episode, 2006)
Boża podszewka. Część druga (2005) .... Andrzej Jurewicz
Na dobre i na złe .... Father Kudelko (1 episode, 2002)
Der Kapitän .... Eike (1 episode, 1997)
Boża podszewka (1997) .... Andrzej Jurewicz
Spellbinder: Land of the Dragon Lord .... Gan (4 episodes, 1997)

Polish dubbing 
 2010: Harry Potter and the Deathly Hallows – Part 1 .... Alastor Moody
 2010: Toy Story 3 .... Lots-O'-Huggin' Bear
 2009: Gwiazda Kopernika
 2009: Race to Witch Mountain .... Burke
 2008: Space Chimps .... Dr. Jagu
 2008: Speed Racer .... Dad
 2007: Enchanted .... Nathaniel
 2007: Harry Potter and the Order of the Phoenix .... Alastor Moody
 2005: Harry Potter and the Goblet of Fire .... Alastor Moody
 2005: Chicken Little .... Buck "Ace" Cluck
 2003: Brother Bear .... Rutt
 2001: Abrafax i piraci z Karaibów .... Captain

Discography

References

External links
 

1952 births
Polish film actors
Polish television actors
Polish male stage actors
Polish male film actors
Polish male television actors
Polish male voice actors
Living people
Recipients of the Silver Medal for Merit to Culture – Gloria Artis
Recipients of the Gold Medal for Merit to Culture – Gloria Artis
20th-century Polish male actors
21st-century Polish male actors
Male actors from Kraków
20th-century Polish male singers
21st-century Polish male singers
21st-century Polish singers
People from Chrzanów